A bridge tower was a type of fortified tower built on a bridge. They were typically built in the period up to early modern times as part of a city or town wall or castle. There is usually a tower at both ends of the bridge. During the 19th century, a number of bridge towers were built in the Gothic Revival style – Tower Bridge in London is perhaps the best known example; however, many original medieval towers survive across Europe.

Function 

These towers were built in pre-medieval and medieval times to guard access to the bridge and to enable the charging of  tolls on important roads crossing rivers, usually near towns and cities. The rivers were often part of the defences of these settlements. As a result, it was important from a defensive perspective that the bridges did not allow attacking enemies to break in. The bridges acted as a bulwark and often had a small drawbridge. In addition to their genuine protective and defensive functions they also played a symbolic and architectural role. Often these towers were the first public buildings that the travellers saw when approaching the city.

Sometimes, the same building served as bridge tower and bridge chapel, for example at the Krämerbrücke in Erfurt.

The high cost of such towers was usually paid for by charging tolls. The gates of bridge towers were closed at night, so that no-one could cross the bridge during silent hours.

Surviving bridge towers

Bosnia and Herzegovina
 The Halebija Tower the Tara Tower on the Stari Most at Mostar, Bosnia and Herzegovina (completed 1567)

Czech Republic
 The Old Town and Lesser Quarter bridge towers on the Charles Bridge in Prague, Czech Republic (built 1357)
 Bridge tower in Stříbro (Mies), Czech Republic (built 1555)

France
 Pont Saint-Bénézet at Avignon, France.
 Le Pont Vieux at Sospel, France.
 Le Pont Vieux at Orthez, France.
 Pont Valentré, Cahors, France.

Germany 
 Bridge tower of the stone bridge in Regensburg (built before the 13th century)
 Medieval tower on the Old Lahn Bridge in Limburg an der Lahn (built 1315–1354)
 Bridge Gate in Heidelberg (15th century, remodelled 1786–88)
 Towers on the South Bridge in Mainz (built 1860–1862)
 Neo-Romanesque tower of the Nibelungen Bridge in Worms (built 1897–1900)
 Bridge Gate in Traben-Trarbach (built 1899)
 Portal of the Old Harburg Elbe Bridge (built 1899)
 Bridge gate in Miltenberg (built 1900)
 Tower of the Friedrich Ebert Bridge in Duisburg (built 1904–1907)

Italy
 The tower of the Ponte Milvio in Rome, Italy
 Castelvecchio Bridge, Verona, Italy

Luxembourg
 The Porte d'Eich (de) and Porte des Bons-Malades (de) gate towers on the Vauban-designed fortified pedestrian bridge, Béinchen (de) (built 1864–1865), part of the UNESCO protected former fortifications of Luxembourg City

Portugal
 The tower of Ucanha Bridge

Spain
 Pont de Besalú, Besalú, Catalonia, Spain.
 Puente de Alcántara, Toledo, Spain.
 Puente de San Martín, Toledo, Spain.

Switzerland
 The Wasserturm ("Water Tower"), part of the Kapellbrücke complex in Lucerne, Switzerland.

United Kingdom
 The Monnow Gate on the Monnow Bridge at Monmouth, Wales (late 13th or early 14th century)

 The bridge tower at Warkworth Bridge in Warkworth, England (late 14th century)
 Tower Bridge in London, England (built 1894). The actual function of these towers is to support a high-level walkway.

See also
 Bridge chapel
 Gate tower
 Gatehouse

Bridges
Towers
Types of gates
!Bridge tower
Medieval architecture